

Paul Scheuerpflug (3 July 1896  – 8 August 1945) was a German general during World War II who commanded the 68th Infantry Division. He was a recipient of the  Knight's Cross of the Iron Cross with Oak Leaves of Nazi Germany.

Scheuerpflug was wounded 8 May 1945, and taken prisoner by Soviet troops. He died in a POW camp hospital at Auschwitz.

Awards and decorations
 Iron Cross (1914) 2nd Class (22 September 1915 & 1st Class (27 January 1917))
 Clasp to the Iron Cross (1939)  2nd Class (25 June 1940) &  1st Class (4 July 1941)
 Knight's Cross of the Iron Cross with Oak Leaves
 Knight's Cross on 6 September 1942 as Oberst and commander of Infanterie-Regiment 116
 791st Oak Leaves on 16 March 1945 as Generalleutnant and commander of 68. Infanterie-Division

References

Citations

Bibliography

 
 

1896 births
1945 deaths
Lieutenant generals of the German Army (Wehrmacht)
German Army personnel of World War I
Recipients of the clasp to the Iron Cross, 1st class
Recipients of the Knight's Cross of the Iron Cross with Oak Leaves
German prisoners of war in World War II held by the Soviet Union
German people who died in Soviet detention
People from Siegen-Wittgenstein
People from the Rhine Province
Military personnel from North Rhine-Westphalia
German Army generals of World War II